Gut Island is a small  island in the Penobscot River, near Old Town and Milford in central Maine.  The island, owned by the Penobscot Indian Nation, is archaeologically important, and has been designated Site 74.91 by the Maine Archaeological Survey.  It was listed on the National Register of Historic Places in 1994 for its archaeological significance, which includes well-stratified evidence of human habitation dating back thousands of years.

Description
It has a rock outcrops at its northern end, and is sandy and graveled at the southern end. It is densely vegetated, with pine and maple trees, and thick underbrush. The island was probably formed by the accumulation of sediment and gravel downstream of the outcrops at its northern end.

The archaeological importance of the island was identified in 1988, during a survey performed prior to relicensing of a downstream hydroelectric power facility, and it underwent excavation that same year by a team from the University of Maine. Deeper layers at the southern eod of the island yielded stone artifacts dating to the Middle and Late Archaic (c. 4000 BCE), including slate tools.

See also
National Register of Historic Places listings in Penobscot County, Maine

References

Archaeological sites on the National Register of Historic Places in Maine
Islands of Maine
Geography of Penobscot County, Maine
National Register of Historic Places in Penobscot County, Maine
Islands of Penobscot County, Maine